The Church of St Mary the Virgin in Boston Spa, West Yorkshire, England is an active Anglican parish church in the archdeaconry of York and the Diocese of York. It is a Grade II listed building.

History
The original church on this site (designed by S. Taite) was constructed from 1812 to 1814; this was replaced by the current church, built between 1872 and 1884 by W. H. Parkinson.

Architectural style
The current church was constructed over twelve years from 1872 to 1884, designed by architect W. H. Parkinson.  The church has a cruciform plan with a four-bay nave and a tower to the west. The vestry is on the southern side.  It is built of ashlar magnesian limestone, although some of the ornamental dressings are of sandstone. The roof is of green slate.

See also
List of places of worship in the City of Leeds
Listed buildings in Boston Spa

References

External links

St Mary's Boston Spa
 
 

Churches in Leeds
Grade II listed churches in Leeds
Anglican Diocese of Leeds
Church of England church buildings in West Yorkshire
Grade II listed churches in West Yorkshire
19th-century Church of England church buildings
Mary, Boston Spa